Passiflora citrina is a species of passion flower (Passiflora) native to Central America. It is also grown as an ornamental plant.

Gallery

citrina